The year 2009 is the 15th year in the history of Fighting Network Rings, a mixed martial arts promotion based in Japan. In 2009 Fighting Network Rings held 5 events beginning with, Rings: The Outsider 5.

Events list

Rings: The Outsider 5

Rings: The Outsider 5 was an event held on March 15, 2009, at Ryogoku Kokugikan in Tokyo, Japan.

Results

Rings: The Outsider 6

Rings: The Outsider 6 was an event held on May 5, 2009, at Differ Ariake Arena in Tokyo, Japan.

Results

Rings: The Outsider 7

Rings: The Outsider 7 was an event held on August 9, 2009, at Differ Ariake Arena in Tokyo, Japan.

Results

Rings: The Outsider 8

Rings: The Outsider 8 was an event held on October 11, 2009, at Differ Ariake Arena in Tokyo, Japan.

Results

Rings: The Outsider 9

Rings: The Outsider 9 was an event held on December 13, 2009, at Differ Ariake Arena in Tokyo, Japan.

Results

See also 
 Fighting Network Rings
 List of Fighting Network Rings events

References

Fighting Network Rings events
2009 in mixed martial arts